Jon Paul Mueller (born January 26, 1970) is an American college baseball coach who has been the head coach of Albany since the start of the 2000 season. Mueller, who was named the 2004 America East Coach of the Year, led the Great Danes to their first NCAA Tournament appearance in 2007.

Playing career
Mueller attended Stillwater High School in upstate New York, where he played baseball and basketball. Mueller won a state basketball championship in his senior season, 1988. He was offered a basketball scholarship at Siena, but chose instead to attend Eckerd. He played both basketball and baseball at the Florida college as a freshman and sophomore but focused exclusively on baseball as a junior and senior. He graduated in 1992.

After getting his master's degree from Saint Rose in 1994, Mueller began a seven-year professional baseball career spent entirely in independent leagues.  From 1994 to 1995, he played for the Marshall Mallards and Will County Claws in the short-lived North Central League. Partway through the 1995 season, he returned to upstate New York, where he played for the Adirondack Lumberjacks from 1995 to 1996 and the Albany-Colonie Diamond Dogs from 1997 to 2000.  Primarily a first baseman and an outfielder, Mueller had a career .286 batting average and hit 76 home runs.

Coaching career

Saint Rose
Mueller's first coaching job came with Saint Rose from 1993 to 1994, where he worked as an assistant while getting his master's degree.

Albany
In 1999, Mueller worked as a volunteer assistant at Albany under head coach Doug O'Brey. In the program's last season in Division II, the Great Danes went 21–21 and reached the ECAC Tournament final.

Mueller was hired as Albany's head coach the following season, the Great Danes' first in Division I. Playing as an independent, they went 19–24. After the season, he played his last season of professional baseball. Albany joined the America East Conference for the 2002 season. In 2004, the team went 37–14 and tied for second in conference. It appeared in its first America East Tournament and Mueller was named the conference's Coach of the Year.

Mueller led the program to its first NCAA Tournament in 2007. After a 26–27 (13–11 America East) regular season, the Great Danes received the third seed in the 2007 America East Tournament. There, they defeated Stony Brook in the opener and Binghamton twice to win the championship and the conference's automatic bid to the 2007 NCAA Tournament.  At the Fayetteville Regional, the team went 0–2, losing 9–0 to host Arkansas and 21–11 to second-seeded Creighton.

From 2000 to 2019, eight of Mueller's players have been selected in the Major League Baseball Draft.  The highest selection was Stephen Woods in 2016, an 8th-round selection of the San Francisco Giants.

Head coaching record
Below is a table of Mueller's yearly records as a collegiate head baseball coach.

See also
 List of current NCAA Division I baseball coaches
 Albany Great Danes

References

External links

Albany Great Danes bio

Living people
1970 births
Adirondack Lumberjacks players
Albany Diamond Dogs players
Albany Great Danes baseball coaches
Albany-Colonie Diamond Dogs players
American men's basketball players
Baseball coaches from New York (state)
Baseball players from New York (state)
Basketball players from New York (state)
College of Saint Rose alumni
Eckerd Tritons baseball players
Eckerd Tritons men's basketball players
People from Stillwater, New York
Saint Rose Golden Knights baseball coaches